Ray R. Clark (September 8, 1877 – May 6, 1926) was a mayor of Long Beach, California.

Clark was born on September 8, 1877 in Barron, Wisconsin. Later Clark and his family moved to Iowa, and then settled at San Bernardino, California in 1884. Clark later moved to Pasadena, California before settling in Long Beach in 1907. He died of heart disease on May 6, 1926 following an operation on his tonsils.

Career
Clark became a public servant in 1924 and was soon appointed mayor. He served as mayor for two consecutive years until his death.

References

External links

Mayors of Long Beach, California
People from Barron, Wisconsin
1877 births
1926 deaths